Donald Sutherland's career spans almost 60 years. He has been nominated for eight Golden Globe Awards, winning two for his performances in the television films Citizen X (1995) and Path to War (2002); the former also earned him a Primetime Emmy Award. An inductee of the Hollywood Walk of Fame and Canadian Walk of Fame, he also received a Canadian Academy Award for the drama film Threshold (1981). Multiple film critics and media outlets have cited him as one of the best actors never to have received an Academy Award nomination. In 2017, he received an Academy Honorary Award for his contributions to cinema. In 2021, he won the Critics' Choice Television Award for Best Supporting Actor in a Movie/Miniseries for his work in the HBO miniseries The Undoing (2020).

Sutherland rose to fame after starring in films including The Dirty Dozen (1967), M*A*S*H (1970), Kelly's Heroes (1970), Klute (1971), Don't Look Now (1973), Fellini's Casanova (1976), 1900 (1976), The Eagle Has Landed (1976), Animal House (1978), Invasion of the Body Snatchers (1978), Ordinary People (1980), and Eye of the Needle (1981). He later went on to star in many other films where he appeared either in leading or supporting roles such as A Dry White Season (1989), JFK (1991), Outbreak (1995), A Time to Kill (1996), Without Limits (1998), Space Cowboys (2000), Big Shot's Funeral (2001), The Italian Job (2003), Cold Mountain (2003), Pride & Prejudice (2005), Aurora Borealis (2006) and The Hunger Games franchise (2012–2015).

Filmography

Film

Television

References 

Male actor filmographies
Canadian filmographies